André Mellerio (1862–1943) was a French art critic.

Mellerio may also refer to:

 Mellerio dits Meller, a French jewellery house
 Palazzo Mellerio, Milan, a late-baroque-style palace in Milan